The Kor-Ingalls Route is a traditional rock climbing route located on Castleton Tower.  Castleton Tower sits in Castle Valley North-East of Moab, Utah.  The Route is recognized in the historic climbing text Fifty Classic Climbs of North America and considered a classic around the world.

References

External links 
rockclimbing.com
summitpost.org
mountainproject.com
supertopo.com

Climbing routes